Grave Matter is a BBC Books original novel written by Justin Richards and based on the long-running British science fiction television series Doctor Who. It features the Sixth Doctor and Peri.

Synopsis
The Doctor and Peri arrive on a fog-shrouded island, not even aware of which century they have landed in. They soon discover that they are on a remote island off the coast of Britain where the local people have put aside modern inventions and lifestyle. However, when a dead body rises from its grave, and the local school children display uncanny adaptivity, the Doctor must discover the secrets of the scientific research carried out by the island's benefactor.

External links
The Cloister Library - Grave Matter

2000 British novels
2000 science fiction novels
Past Doctor Adventures
Sixth Doctor novels
Novels by Justin Richards